The Barkana Falls, formed by Seetha River, is a water falls located near Agumbe in Shimoga district of state of Karnataka, India and the water falls is among the ten highest waterfalls in India. This water fall region is filled with water only during rainy season.

The falls

See also
List of waterfalls in India
List of waterfalls in India by height
Mangalore

References

External links 
World waterfalls database entry

Waterfalls of Karnataka
Geography of Shimoga district